Alexander Elphinstone may refer to:

Alexander Elphinstone, 1st Lord Elphinstone
Alexander Elphinstone, 2nd Lord Elphinstone (1510–1547)
Alexander Elphinstone, 4th Lord Elphinstone (1552–1638)
Alexander Elphinstone, 19th Lord Elphinstone
Sir Alexander Elphinstone, de jure 6th Baronet (died 1795), of the Elphinstone baronets
Sir Alexander Elphinstone, de jure 8th Baronet (1801–1888), of the Elphinstone baronets
Sir Alexander Logie Elphinstone, 10th Baronet (1880–1970) (claimed title 1927), of the Elphinstone baronets